The 1957 World Table Tennis Championships men's singles was the 24th edition of the men's singles championship. 

Toshiaki Tanaka defeated Ichiro Ogimura in the final, winning three sets to nil to secure the title.

Seeds

  Ichiro Ogimura
  Toshiaki Tanaka
  Ivan Andreadis
  Richard Bergmann
  Ferenc Sidó
  Matei Gantner
  Yoshio Tomita
  Elemér Gyetvai
  Ladislav Štípek
  Kálmán Szepesi
  Chiang Yung-Ning
  Tiberiu Harasztosi

Results

See also
List of World Table Tennis Championships medalists

References

-